Ensor-Keenan House is a historic home located at Columbia, South Carolina. It built about 1870, and is a -story, Italianate style frame dwelling. It features a central projecting pavilion with a steeply pitched hipped roof and full width front porch. It was the home of Dr. Joshua Fulton Ensor, second medical superintendent of the State Asylum (South Carolina State Hospital).

It was added to the National Register of Historic Places in 1979.

References

Houses on the National Register of Historic Places in South Carolina
Italianate architecture in South Carolina
Houses completed in 1870
Houses in Columbia, South Carolina
National Register of Historic Places in Columbia, South Carolina